This article lists National Historic Landmarks in New York City, of which there are 116.  One of the New York City sites is also a national monument, and there are two more national monuments in NYC as well.  These are listed further below.  It also briefly discusses New York City designated landmarks.

In all of New York State there are 276 National Historic Landmarks (NHLs), which is the most of any state.  For a discussion of state NHLs inside and outside of NYC, see List of NHLs in New York State.  For consistency, the sites are named here as designated under the National Historic Landmark program.

National Historic Landmarks in New York City

|}

New York City Designated Historic Sites
The New York City Landmarks Preservation Commission was created following the preservation fight and subsequent demolition of Pennsylvania Station.  New York City's right to limit owners' ability to convert landmarked buildings was upheld by the U.S. Supreme Court in 1978.  Many of the NYC NHLs are listed, either individually or as part of historic districts, in the List of New York City Designated Landmarks.

National Monuments in Manhattan
There are nine National Monuments, National Memorials or National Historic Sites in New York City (all but the Statue of Liberty are also National Historic Landmarks):
African Burial Ground National Monument, declared February 27, 2006
Governors Island National Monument, declared January 19, 2001
Statue of Liberty National Monument, declared October 15, 1924
Stonewall National Monument, declared June 24, 2016 
Federal Hall National Memorial
General Grant National Memorial (Grant's Tomb)
Castle Clinton National Monument 
Hamilton Grange National Memorial 
Theodore Roosevelt Birthplace National Historic Site

Former National Historic Landmarks in New York City

See also
List of National Historic Landmarks in New York
List of National Historic Landmarks by state
List of Registered Historic Places in New York City
List of New York City Designated Landmarks

References

External links
National Park Service listings of National Historic Landmarks

 
National Historic Landmarks
New York